The Ministry of the Interior was from 1860 the interior ministry of the Ottoman Empire, based in Constantinople (now Istanbul).

Organization
The ministry included:
Census Bureau (Sidjili-Noufouz-Idaressi, Bureau de recensement)
Bureau of Emigrants (Mouhadjir Idaressi, Bureau des émigrés)
Passport Bureau (Bureau des Passeports)
Pension Fund Directorate (Takaud sandighi Nazaréti, Direction de la caisse de retraites)
Directorate of Internal Press (Matbouat Midiréti, Direction de la Presse Intérieure)
Commission for the Selection of Employees (Intihab méémorin Commissionou, Commission pour le choix de employés)
Department of Service Staff (Sidjili-ahwal-Idaressi, Direction des états de service des fonctionnaires)

Circa 1905 the budget of the ministry was 495,300 Ottoman lira out of 954,364 for the government.

Ministers
 Talaat Pasha was head of the ministry during World War I. He was responsible for the Armenian genocide during his tenure.

Predecessor
Previously the Grand Vizier, upon the counsel of his advisor, managed the internal affairs of the state, but in 1860 a western-style ministry of the interior was established as part of a reform of the empire's administration.

Successor
Ministry of the Interior (Turkey) currently governs domestic affairs in Turkey.

References

Internal affairs ministries
Interior
1860 establishments in the Ottoman Empire